The second season of Brazil's Next Top Model was filmed from July to August 2008 and premiered on September 4, 2008. Model Fernanda Motta hosted the show and aims to find the next top fashion model. The winner received a R$200,000 contract, management, and representation by Ford Models, a new car, a photo shoot for the cover, and a six-page spread within Vogue Brazil. The season featured 13 contestants. For the first time, the show had an international destination during this season, which was Buenos Aires, Argentina.

The winner was 20-year-old Maíra Vieira from Belo Horizonte, Minas Gerais.

Cast

Contestants
(Ages stated are at start of contest)

Judges
 Fernanda Motta (host)
 Dudu Bertholini
 Duda Molainos
 Erika Palomino

Episodes

Episode 1
First aired: September 4, 2008

In the first episode, the public attends the choice of the thirteen finalists of the reality show. The host Fernanda Motta, and the judges, Érika Palomino, Duda Molinos, and Dudu Bertholini decide who stays in the competition, after an individual interview with each of the 20 selected contestants. Soon afterward, four girls are eliminated, and the remaining sixteen do a topless photo shoot for a campaign against breast cancer. Even though some of the girls feel uncomfortable posing half-naked, they all participate in the shoot. The thirteen finalists move into the model home.

Special guests: Rodrigo Marques (photographer) & Bruno Candiotto (publicity)

Episode 2
First aired: September 11, 2008

The girls received tips from designer Amir Slama, founder of "Rosa Chá", one of the most important Brazilian labels. For the reward challenge, the girls had only 5 minutes to put together an outfit with the other participants' clothes, without communicating with one another. Flávia Giussani was criticized for her choice. Isabel won the challenge and received a dress and a dinner in the restaurant "Chakras" with 3 friends as a reward; she chose Alinne, Malana, and Marianna to join her.

The photo shoot was based on horror movies and each girl wore makeup based on the film she was supposed to represent. They had to express three specific moods: sexy, evil and scared. Isabel once again gave up in the middle of the photo shoot, and, later at the panel, all of the judges agreed it had been a "big mistake". Alinne's and Dayse's pictures were praised as the best ones by the judges. Flavia Gleichmann showed a great improvement compared to last week's performance. In the end, Luana was eliminated, as the judges did not think her personality had translated well onto her pictures. 
 
Bottom two: Carol Vieira & Luana Caroline
Eliminated: Luana Caroline
Featured photographer: Rodrigo Marques (photo shoot) & Bruno Candiotto (publicity)
Special guests: Amir Slama (fashion designer) & Kapel (make-up artist)

Episode 3
First aired: September 18, 2008
 
The girls were taken to EV salon for makeovers. Marianna did not like her makeover; she complained about it throughout the episode and her attitude was later severely criticized by the panel.

The models were paired up for the photo shoot where one of them is given the task to embody a mechanic, and the other, a snobby high-class woman. Alinne, Elly, and Priscila were praised for their resourcefulness. Isabel and Rebecca showed no improvement. The girls also had their first runway lesson with Namie Wehby, during which Flavia Gleichmann and Malana were harshly criticized for their walks, and Rebeca was warned about not being able to fully close her mouth.

At the panel, Flávia Giussani was praised for her attitude. The girls were asked to judge their performance and decide which of the pair had done better in their photo shoot. In the end, Isabel was eliminated because of her lack of interest in the fashion world.

Bottom two: Isabel Correa & Rebeca Sampaio
Eliminated: Isabel Correa
Featured photographer: Rodrigo Marques & Bruno Candiotto (publicity)
Special guests: Diogo Molinos (make-up artist) & Namie Wihnby (runway coach)

Episode 4
First aired: September 25, 2008

The girls continue the runway lessons with Namie Wehby. He introduced them to various types of runway walks. The challenge this week was to put on lipstick Avon with one hand while walking on the runway, and handling 3 dogs in the other hand. The winner was Priscila, who was given a shopping voucher valued at R$1500.00. Rebeca was criticized for showing no evolution.

In the photo shoot, the girls embodied João Machado's plastic art and are dressed in organic food, such as squid, pig ears, beef, and raw salmon. Dayse Lima was disgusted by being dressed in beef, even being vegetarian, the model tried to be professional but even though it showed in her photos; the judges think that she exaggerated all of her expressions. Unlike Dayse, Maira is told that she has to exaggerate and show emotions. At panel Alinne and Flávia Giussani are told that they have not shown any kind of evolution. Dayse was once again criticized for not handling correctly feedback from the judges. Marianna is also criticized for not being able to let go of her "good girl" image. Flávia Giussani was eliminated for not showing attitude in her photos.

Bottom two: Flávia Giussani & Marianna Henud
Eliminated: Flávia Giussani
Featured photographer: Márcia Fasoli (photo shoot) & Bruno Candiotto (publicity)
Special guests: Cacá Moraes (official Avon's make-up artist) & João Machado (plastic designer)

Episode 5
First aired: October 2, 2008

At sunrise, the girls are summoned by soldiers for the challenge of the week: to join military training in the style of the Brazilian film, Elite Troop (in Portuguese, Tropa de Elite). In the barracks, they must prove, among classes of ballet with the choreographer Laís Correa, that they are disciplined and have the ability to overcome obstacles. In the final challenge, the girls must go through a sequence of physical obstacles followed by a quick photo shoot. Alinne felt a terrible pain in her legs because of an accident she had two years ago. Despite this she completed the race and along with Priscila and Carol, won the challenge, The prize was an afternoon at the Kyron Spa.

The next day, Namie Wihby came back to the house to teach the girls a lot more about different kinds of catwalks. The girls also took a yoga class with Mauro Giuselli using the new kit Nívea My Silhouette.

After an entertaining message from Pazzeto, the girls are informed by Fernanda Motta that this week's photoshoot will be based on the famous pin up's but at the same time, they will also pose as giants. Malana and Maíra are criticized for the lack of variety in their pictures. Once in the house, the girls receive a visit from the fashion designer Juliana Jabour, who gives them tips about the fashion world.

At the panel, Élly, Rebeca, and Dayse are praised for their visible evolution since the beginning of the show. Priscila and Alinne are criticized for not showing any improvement. Malana was criticized for not being able to show her spirit through her pictures. Maíra is criticized for her lack of variety in her expressions; she's had the same facial expression in all of the photos she's done throughout the competition. Flavia is told that she does not photograph well. Marianna and Carol were in the bottom 2 for being unable to demonstrate attitude, and personality in the photos. Carol was sent home.

Bottom two: Carol Vieira & Marianna Henud
Eliminated: Carol Vieira
Featured photographer: Pedro Molinos (photo shoot) e Bruno Candiotto (publicity)
Special guests: Fernando Bragança & Bernardo Rolla (From Brazilian Army), Laís Correa (teacher dancer), Juliana Jabour (fashion designer) & Mauro Giuselini (yoga's teacher)

Episode 6
First aired: October 9, 2008

To commemorate the Centenary of Japanese Immigration in Brazil, the week they made a tribute to the land of the rising sun. After the girls received Fernanda's Mail talking about the history of Brazil.

The 9 models meet fashion stylist, Erika Ikezili. They do a workshop on Japanese culture, which serves as the inspiration for the challenge of the week: participate in Erika's Runway Fashion Show, using the Guetta, a Japanese wooden clog. After the challenge, Pazzeto gave some tips to Maíra and Flavia, ignoring Rebeca, who felt excluded and ignored. Dayse and Elly won the challenge and dinner with two friends (Maíra and Malana) at a Japanese restaurant, Shintori.

Dayse's bad attitude begins to anger some of the girls, mainly Alinne and Marianna. Her behavior is also reviewed by Namie, who once again calls her arrogant. In the photo shoot, the girls had to dress as super-heroines of manga, suspended 10 feet from the ground by wires, which caused much discomfort. Most of the girls took great photos. Maíra showed great improvement; she finally succeeded in giving a vast variety of facial expressions. Marianna was praised for her use of body language. Just before the photo shoot Elly begins to feel sick and fails to deliver a good picture.

On the panel, the judges praised Rebeca for finally being able to take a picture with her mouth fully closed. Maíra was also praised for her facial expressions and Malana for her softness. Dayse was harshly criticized for the lack of variety in her pictures. In the end, Fernanda eliminates Flavia for lack of feminism in her photos and subtleness.

Bottom two: Flavia Gleichmann & Priscila Mallmann
Eliminated: Flavia Gleichmann
Featured photographer: Pedro Molinos (photo shoot) e Bruno Candiotto (publicity)
Special guests: Erika Ikezili (fashion designer), Milica Zerlotti (technical effects in air) e Alex Cassimiro (stylist)

Episode 7
First aired: October 16, 2008

The girls go through a workshop with Fernando Torquato, who teaches them to pose and various types of facial expressions. In the end, the girls receive a video from Érika Palomino, inviting them to visit the "House of Palomino". There, the girls put what they learned into practice by taking three pictures, showing a specific emotion. Alinne won the challenge, Cocci's clothes, and an interview for the site's "House of Palomino". That night Fernanda went to the house for dinner and talked to the girls about her career.

In the photo shoot, the girls are dressed by the fashion photographer Fabricio Maia and had to pose with actress and model Bia Schmidt. At the panel, the judges (in the absence of Erica) choose Rebeca's, Priscila's, and Dayse's pictures as the best of the mini-challenge. The three managed to show more emotions. Elly was criticized for her lack of concentration and for not interacting with Bia. Priscila had the best picture of the group, while Maíra continues progressing, but is not confident enough. Elly and Rebeca land in the bottom two by the lack of concentration at the time of the shoot, but in the end, Rebeca is eliminated.

Bottom two: Élly Rosa & Rebeca Sampaio
Eliminated: Rebeca Sampaio
Featured photographer: Pedro Molinos
Special guests: Fernando Torquatto (fashion designer), Bia Schmidt (model and actress), Fabrício Maia (stylist), Sérgio Amaral, Marcelo Ferrari (both are Key Magazine's journalist) and André do Val (fashion editor of House of Palomino)

Episode 8
First aired: October 23, 2008

The models visit the "Osklen's" store and meet the fashion designer Oskar Metsavaht, who explains the entire process of designing a brand and shows some of the summer 08/09 collection. As a challenge, the girls try some of the clothes and simulate an audition for a fashion show. Malana and Elly were praised for their choice of clothes and their attitude. Alinne had the worst performance because of her exaggeration. At night, the girls visit the set of the nacional Cori's campaign where Fernanda Motta is doing a photo shoot.

In this week's photoshoot, the girls have to represent different fashion trends from various decades.
 
On the panel, the judges praised the evolution of all the girls. Elly and Priscila are chosen as the best of the night, with photos that showed a sexy side, but were also glamorous, Maira was praised for her picture being the most versatile and transcended time. Alinne once again failed to take a good picture. Malana was criticized for being too over the top, her picture was the weakest of the bunch. Even being one of the most consistent contestants, Alinne was sent packing.

The judges showed concern about Priscila's weight loss. The other girls are worried that Priscila has not been eating well and losing too much weight. Priscila says she's been eating well, and she's convinced that she needs to diet and exercise more so that she can reach an ideal weight.

Bottom two: Alinne Giacomini & Malana de Freitas
Eliminated: Alinne Giacomini
Featured Photographer: Pedro Molinos
Special Guests: Oskar Metsavaht (fashion designer) e Lavoisier (makeup artist)

Episode 9
First aired: October 30, 2008

After a workshop about acting, the girls were tested for a TV commercial, speaking in Spanish. Priscila wins the challenge, getting as a reward one dinner in a famous restaurant with two friends, and a commercial with Fernanda Motta about breast cancer. The girls then were styled as men for their photo shoot and had to pose in pairs with working models, portraying a sexy couple. This photo shoot was inspired by the gender swap shoot on the episode The Girl Who Takes Credit from America's Next Top Model, Season 8. Mariana Richardt from Season 1 makes an appearance as one of the models. Priscila, Élly, and Maíra are praised during their photo shoots. Malana was said to be too masculine, even though they were supposed to look feminine. Marianna was criticized for looking like a girl and focusing too much on looking pretty, while Dayse couldn't make a connection with her partner.

At the panel, Malana redeems herself from her cockiness during the last judging, by opening up. Maíra and Priscila get great praise from the judges, thanks to their development. Dayse and Marianna both got the worst critiques, since they didn't get into the character, and didn't work with their partners. After deliberation, the judges decided to send Marianna home, since she's been criticized for the same reason since the beginning of the competition, and still, didn't let her model side show through.

Bottom two: Dayse Lima & Marianna Henud
Eliminated: Marianna Henud
Featured photographer: Rodrigo Marques
Special guests: Mariana Richardt (Season 1 Contestant), Carolina Herrera (fashion designer) & Laís Correa (choreographer)

Episode 10
First aired: November 6, 2008

The candidates are surprised with a trip to an ecological resort in São Paulo, the Paradise Ecolodge, and learn about eco-fashion, a new niche of the fashion world. In the challenge of the week, should customize a shirt and still parade the catwalk in stylish, with both the concept of creation as valerian the presentation points. Despite the creativity of the presentation Dayse, Elly comes out victorious and won a prize and a gold necklace from around the reservation. Already in a photo shoot, the theme was the side fashionâ most of the garbage, which should embody monsters of pollution through the creations of Marcio Banfi, Stylist of Fernanda Motta.

Back in São Paulo, the girls face the judges. Elly was praised by the picture that, although strange, was the only one who figured the issue properly, Priscila had a weak test and back in every sense; Maíra, despite a weak picture, was notable for its development and loss of their paradigms; Malana was criticized for being tense in the trial and not posing, Dayse by opinion and mechanics in their photos and bad attitudes demonstrated by the house.

In the end, Priscila and Dayse were in the bottom two. Despite being photogenic and having evolved during the program, Fernanda eliminates Dayse because it was not as complete as the other girls and was even surprised with the news that they would be leaving for Buenos Aires, Argentina, as part of Fashion Week of Argentina.

Bottom two: Dayse Lima & Priscila Mallmann
Eliminated: Dayse Lima
Featured photographer: Rodrigo Marques
Special guests: Marcio Banfi (stylist), Ana Cândida (creator of the project Ecotec) & Lizo Manoel Filho (creator resort's ecological paradise Ecological)

Episode 11
First aired: November 13, 2008

The girls travel to Buenos Aires, Argentina, and in the company of Pazetto, will have a great opportunity to hear about Fashion Week in Buenos Aires, the most important event in the country. The girls have access to scenes and are able to talk to big names in fashion, such as Fernanda Bruchiele and Laurencio Adot, as well as participate in a simulated casting with Gabriela Vidal, the agency's La Bien Models.

The reward challenge took place in one of the most famous shows in the Argentinean capital, Esquina de Carlos Gardel, where they had 30 minutes to learn the tango and make a number with professional dancers, showing passion. The winner, Priscila, was allowed to choose between three looks that the Argentinean brand, Tramando, had prepared for her. After talking about what they had learned with each other, the girls needed to show everything they know in a photo shoot without a theme and the inspiration of women in the 1940s, with a photograph of a collection of Pablo Ramirez, where they should improvise and use all they learned during the program.

Back to Brazil, the most exciting elimination begins. The girls demonstrate to the jury that they could find criticism of Argentine models, mainly in runway walk. After talking about how much they want to go to the Top 3, the judges criticize their pictures: Elly demonstrates great body expression, elegance and an absolute control, showing her best work; Malana brings back her lightness in the photos; Maíra showed a bad angle of her face, a harmonious set, but weak and has not yet found the courage and conviction to be a model, still evolving, but is unstable. And Priscila, despite her bright face and strong poses, was unable to work her body and her curves, and thus, sending her home.

Bottom two: Maíra Vieira & Priscilla Mallmann
Eliminated: Priscila Mallmann
Featured photographer: Pedro Molinos
Special guests: Pablo Ramires (fashion designer), Fernanda Bruchiele (creator of Buenos Aires Fashion Week), Gabriela Vidal (La Biena Models' Booker), Juan Carlos Copes (tango's teacher) e Laurencio Adot (fashion designer).

Episode 12
First aired: November 20, 2008

After being in shock by the elimination of Priscila, the remaining three girls are preparing for the final challenge, in which they will be tested on everything they had learned so far. First, the video challenge, in which they record a commercial for next season of Brazil's Next Top Model; then the photography challenge, which simulated a cover for Vogue Brazil over the eyes of the fashion editor of the magazine, Giovani Frassoni, and finally, would the booker by Marco Aurelio Key, director of Ford Models Brazil.

After talking to recharge your batteries and their families counting on his life, the girls faced the jury. Maíra is extremely professional in the business and its evolution is the most visible, with the largest repertoire of poses, Elly, from Marcus Aurelius, is the most complete of participants, can be light, modern, but Malana, who throughout the competition managed to bring her luster in her eyes, is more sophisticated and mysterious, becoming a model of high fashion, she left her nervousness hinder the commercial and was eliminated.

Bottom two: Élly Rosa & Malana de Freitas
Eliminated: Malana de Freitas
Featured photographer: Daniel Klajmick
Special guests: Giovani Frasson (fashion editor of Vogue Brazil), Marco Aurélio Rey (editor in chief of Ford Models Brazil), Marcelo Gomes (make-up artist)

In the grand finale, the girls go to the hall of SENAC, along with all other participants in the top 13 and Fernanda Motta, the parade of the Neon, from the judge Dudu Bertholini, where the theme is a retrospective of the brand over the years of 2008 and the program itself.

After the judges once again come together and the girls are evaluated picture by picture from the start of the competition. Ultimately, a teary Fernanda announces Maíra as Brazil's Next Top Model for being more complete, professional & ready for the market.

Final two: Élly Rosa & Maíra Vieira
Brazil's Next Top Model: Maíra Vieira
Special guests: Season 2's Models, Rita Camponato (designer of Neon)

Episode 13
First aired: November 27, 2008

This episode goes back to the beginning of the competition and shows viewers Maira's journey toward becoming Brazil's Next Top Model.

Results

 The contestant was eliminated
 The contestant won the competition

Notes

References

External links
 Official website 

Brazil's Next Top Model
2008 Brazilian television seasons
Television shows filmed in São Paulo (state)
Television shows filmed in Argentina